Eric P. Winer (born 1956) is a medical oncologist and clinical researcher specializing in breast cancer. He is director of Yale Cancer Center and physician-in-chief of Smilow Cancer Network, effective February 1, 2022. From 1997 to 2021, he was the Chief of the Breast Oncology Program at Dana–Farber Cancer Institute in Boston, Massachusetts. Beginning in 2013, he held a range of institutional roles at Dana-Farber, most recently as Chief of Clinical Development. He has been the Thompson Chair in Breast Cancer Research and a Professor of Medicine at Harvard Medical School. He is currently the president-elect of the American Society of Clinical Oncology. His career has been focused on breast cancer treatment and research.

Education and Training 

Winer received his undergraduate degree in History and Russian/East European Studies from Yale University in 1978 and graduated from the Yale School of Medicine in 1983. He went on to complete residency training in internal medicine at Yale-New Haven Hospital, where he served as chief medical resident.

From 1987 to 1989, Winer held a fellowship in hematology-oncology at Duke University Medical Center. From 1989 to 1997 he was on the faculty at Duke University Medical Center and served as co-director of the Duke University Medical Center Multidisciplinary Breast Program. He moved to Dana–Farber Cancer Institute after 10 years at Duke.

Career 

Winer joined Brigham and Women's Hospital and Dana–Farber Cancer Institute in 1997 and was appointed director of the Breast Oncology Center and Associate Professor of Medicine at Harvard Medical School. He directed the breast cancer program at Dana–Farber Cancer Institute, Brigham and Women's Hospital, and Dana-Farber/Harvard Cancer Center for twenty four years.

In addition to his role at Dana–Farber Cancer Institute, over his twenty-four years, he also served as co-chair of the then-Cancer and Leukemia Group B (CALGB)/Alliance Breast Cancer committee, chair of the American Society of Clinical Oncology (ASCO) Health Services Committee, Board of Directors member, American Society of Clinical Oncology, co-chair of Breast Cancer Steering Committee, National Cancer Institute, co-chair of Advanced Breast Cancer Conference and Consensus Panel, co-chair of St. Gallen Consensus Panel on Early Stage Breast Cancer, and Chief Scientific Advisor and co-chair, Scientific Advisory Board, Susan G. Komen for the Cure. Over his career, he has divided his time between patient care, clinical research and administration.

Research 

Winer has conducted numerous clinical trials during his career. These trials span virtually all aspects of breast cancer. For over a decade, he was the co-chair of the CALGB/Alliance Breast Cancer Committee. Currently, he is the principal investigator of the Dana-Farber/Harvard Cancer Center NCI SPORE (National Cancer Institute Specialized Program of Research Excellence) in breast cancer. His research group focuses on improving care through the development of new treatment approaches. He also recognizes the importance of de-escalating therapy in patients who can do just as well with less treatment. In collaboration with the Department of Defense and the National Cancer Institute, Winer is also the principal investigator on a study sponsored by the Alliance for Clinical Trials in Oncology, assessing the use of aspirin as adjuvant therapy for node-positive breast cancer patients.

Articles 

Winer has authored over 400 publications. Here is a selection of Winer's recently published articles:

 Berry DA, Cirrincione C, Henderson IC, et al. Estrogen-Receptor Status and Outcomes of Modern Chemotherapy for Patients with Node-Positive Breast Cancer. JAMA. 2006;295:1658-67.
 Muss HB, Berry DA, Cirrincione CT, et al. Adjuvant chemotherapy in older women with early-stage breast cancer. New England Journal of Medicine. 2009;360:2055-2065.
 Sikov WM, Berry DA, Perou CM, et al. Impact of the Addition of Carboplatin and/or Bevacizumab to Neoadjuvant Once-per-Week Paclitaxel Followed by Dose-Dense Doxorubicin and Cyclophosphamide on Pathologic Complete Response Rates in Stage II to III Triple-Negative Breast Cancer: CALGB 40603 (Alliance). Journal of Clinical Oncology. 2015;33:13-21.
 Tolaney SM, Barry WT, Dang CT, et al. Adjuvant Paclitaxel and Trastuzumab for Node-Negative, HER2-Positive Breast Cancer. New England Journal of Medicine. 2015;372:134-41.
 Ni J, Ramkissoon SH, Xie S, et al. Combination inhibition of PI3K and mTORC1 yields durable remissions in mice bearing orthotopic patient-derived xenografts of HER2-positive breast cancer brain metastases. Nature Medicine. 2016;22:723-6.

Awards 

 Claire W. and Richard P. Morse Research Award, Dana–Farber Cancer Institute, 2002 
 Tisch Award for Outstanding Achievement, Dana–Farber Cancer Institute, 2006 
Fellow of the American Society of Clinical Oncology, 2008 
 A. Clifford Barger Excellence in Mentoring Award, Harvard Medical School, 2009 
Advancing the Careers of Women Faculty Award, Dana–Farber Cancer Institute, 2013 
 The William L. McGuire Memorial Lectureship, San Antonio Breast Cancer Symposium, 2016 
 Gianni Bonadonna Breast Cancer Award and Lecture, American Society of Clinical Oncology, 2017

References 

Living people
American oncologists
Yale College alumni
Duke University alumni
Harvard Medical School faculty
1956 births
Yale School of Medicine alumni